The Banu Ghaniya invasion of North Africa sometimes referred to as the Banu Ghaniya Rebellion was a series of military campaigns undertaken by the Banu Ghaniya against the Almohads in hopes of re-establishing the Almoravid dynasty from November 1184 to 1237/1238.

References

Bibliography
 
 

Banu Ghaniya